Ángel Javier Arizmendi de Lucas (born 3 March 1984) is a Spanish former professional footballer who played either as a forward or winger.

He played 181 La Liga matches over nine seasons, scoring a combined 20 goals for Atlético Madrid, Racing de Santander, Deportivo, Valencia, Zaragoza, Getafe and Mallorca.

All youth levels comprised, Arizmendi earned 13 caps for Spain. He appeared once with the full side.

Club career
Born in Madrid, and a product of local Atlético Madrid's youth system, Arizmendi made his La Liga debut for the first team on 15 February 2004, in a 1–3 away loss against FC Barcelona. The following season, he played on loan with fellow league club Racing de Santander.

As opportunities were scarce at Atlético, Arizmendi was signed by Deportivo de La Coruña for €2 million, on 3 January 2006. The Colchoneros bought him back according to a clause in the contract but, on 21 June 2007, he joined Valencia CF on a six-year deal.

During 2007–08, Arizmendi's physical style of play was occasionally put to use at right back due to injuries to habitual Miguel and Marco Caneira. On 23 March 2008, he scored his first Valencia goal in a 3–2 win at Real Madrid, while also helping the Che to the campaign's Copa del Rey.

On 12 August 2008, Arizmendi was signed by Real Zaragoza for roughly €4 million on a six-year contract. In his debut year, he was instrumental as the Aragonese returned to the top flight after just one year out, netting nine times in the league alone.

On 30 June 2010, after greatly helping Zaragoza retain their status – 31 games, five goals, 2,064 minutes – Arizmendi signed for six years with Getafe CF, qualified for the UEFA Europa League. In August of the following year, however, after an unassuming season and the arrival of new manager Luis García, he moved to Neuchâtel Xamax in Switzerland on a season-long loan.

Along three other teammates, Arizmendi was released from contract by the Super League team on 6 January 2012. He played his first match in his second spell on 4 February, appearing 24 minutes and being booked in a 0–1 home loss against Real Madrid.

International career
In 2003, without having played any football at the highest level, Arizmendi was called up to the Spain under-20 team that competed at the 2003 FIFA World Youth Championship in the United Arab Emirates, where he scored an extra time winner over Canada in the quarter-finals after coming on as a substitute. The nation went on to finish as runner-up.

He made his debut for the senior side in a friendly against England on 7 February 2007, playing the final 25 minutes in a 1–0 victory at Old Trafford.

Controversy
During the 2005 Mediterranean Games, Arizmendi controversially celebrated the nation's gold medal carrying a Spanish flag which hailed from the days of Francisco Franco's fascist dictatorship. The player argued it was thrown from the stands at Estadio de los Juegos Mediterráneos, and that he did not notice the emblem on it.

Personal life
After retiring, Arizmendi took a Master's degree in private banking.

Honours
Valencia
Copa del Rey: 2007–08

Spain U20
FIFA U-20 World Cup runner-up: 2003

Spain U23
Mediterranean Games: 2005

References

External links

1984 births
Living people
Footballers from Madrid
Spanish footballers
Association football forwards
La Liga players
Segunda División players
Segunda División B players
Atlético Madrid B players
Atlético Madrid footballers
Racing de Santander players
Deportivo de La Coruña players
Valencia CF players
Real Zaragoza players
Getafe CF footballers
RCD Mallorca players
Swiss Super League players
Neuchâtel Xamax FCS players
Spain youth international footballers
Spain under-21 international footballers
Spain under-23 international footballers
Spain international footballers
Competitors at the 2005 Mediterranean Games
Mediterranean Games medalists in football
Mediterranean Games gold medalists for Spain
Spanish expatriate footballers
Expatriate footballers in Switzerland
Spanish expatriate sportspeople in Switzerland